This article details the qualifying phase for table tennis at the 2016 Summer Olympics. The competition at these Games will comprise a total of 172 table tennis players coming from their respective NOCs; each may enter up to six athletes, two male and two female athletes in singles events and up to one men's and one women's team in team events. Host nation Brazil has automatically qualified six athletes; a team of three men and women with one each competing in the singles.

The top 22 male and top 22 female players on the International Table Tennis Federation's Olympic ranking list as of May 2016 will be qualified for the singles event at the Games. No nation can have more than two players per gender in the singles at these Games, so some players below the twenty-eighth position are given a qualifying place based on ranking.

Forty places will be awarded to the table tennis players with a maximum of two per NOC and gender through the following continental qualification tournaments between July 1, 2015 and April 24, 2016: six each from Africa and Latin America, eleven each from Asia and Europe, and three each from North America and Oceania. One invitational place per gender will be allocated by the International Table Tennis Federation (ITTF).

For the team events, the highest-ranked NOC from each continent that already contains two qualified players for the singles adds a quota place to form a team of three players and thereby secures a direct qualifying place for the Games based on the ITTF Olympic Team Ranking list. The remaining ten teams are allotted to the nine highest-ranked NOCs in any continent and to the host nation Brazil (if not qualified by any means) that have two players qualified for the singles. If less than nine nations, the next best team with a single player secures a place for the Olympics.

Summary

Events
†: Athlete qualified for team event only.

Men's singles

Legend

 EA – Winner from the East Asia zone
 SEA – Winner from the Southeast Asia zone
 SA – Winner from the South Asia zone
 MA – Winner from the Middle Asia zone
 WA – Winner from the West Asia zone

Men's team

Women's singles

Legend

 EA – Winner from the East Asia zone
 SEA – Winner from the Southeast Asia zone
 SA – Winner from the South Asia zone
 MA – Winner from the Middle Asia zone
 WA – Winner from the West Asia zone

Women's team

References

External links
 International Table Tennis Federation (ITTF)

Qualification for the 2016 Summer Olympics